The Order of National Glory is the highest military award of the Republic of China Armed Forces, the army of the Republic of China (Taiwan).  It was established on November 8, 1937.

See also
List of orders, decorations and medals of the Republic of China

References

Military of the Republic of China
Orders, decorations, and medals of the Republic of China
Awards established in 1937